The Europe/Africa Zone was one of the three zones of the regional Davis Cup competition in 1997.

In the Europe/Africa Zone there were four different tiers, called groups, in which teams competed against each other to advance to the upper tier. Winners in Group II advanced to the Europe/Africa Zone Group I. Teams who lost their respective ties competed in the relegation play-offs, with winning teams remaining in Group II, whereas teams who lost their play-offs were relegated to the Europe/Africa Zone Group III in 1998.

Participating nations

Draw

 and  promoted to Group I in 1998.

First round

Norway vs. Nigeria

Georgia vs. Slovenia

Egypt vs. Portugal

Lithuania vs. Yugoslavia

Ivory Coast vs. Latvia

Poland vs. Ghana

Ireland vs. Belarus

Finland vs. Greece

Second round

Slovenia vs. Norway

Portugal vs. Yugoslavia

Poland vs. Ivory Coast

Finland vs. Belarus

Relegation play-offs

Georgia vs. Nigeria

Egypt vs. Lithuania

Latvia vs. Ghana

Ireland vs. Greece

Third round

Portugal vs. Norway

Finland vs. Poland

References

External links
Davis Cup official website

Davis Cup Europe/Africa Zone
Europe Africa Zone Group II